Infiniti is the debut album of the singer-songwriter/multi-instrumentalist Salman Ahmad. The album was released on July 1, 2005 under the record label EMI. Singles from the album include "Ghoom Taana" and "Al-Vida". The single "Ghoom Taana" also featured in Junoon's seventh studio album Dewaar. Although, the album was released as a solo album of Salman Ahmad but it was slated to be Junoon's eighth studio album.

The single "Ghoom Taana" featured Shubha Mudgal on vocals, but originally the song was sung by Ali Noor, from Noori and former Junoon vocalist, Ali Azmat.

Track listing
All music written & composed by Salman Ahmad and Sabir Zafar, those which are not are mentioned below.

Personnel
All information is taken from the CD.

Junoon
Salman Ahmad - vocals, lead guitar

Additional musicians
Ashiq Ali Mir - tabla and dhol
John Alec - bass guitar and sitar
Mekaal Hasan - bass guitar
Jay Dittamo - drums and percussion
Vocals on "Ghoom Taana" by Shubha Mudgal

Production
Produced by John Alec and Salman Ahmad
Recorded and mixed at Digital Fidelity Studio, Lahore, Pakistan and Grandview Studios in Grandview, New York
Engineered and mixed by John Alec

External links
 Official Website

2006 albums
Junoon (band) albums
EMI Records albums
Urdu-language albums